Will Rogers House or William Rogers House may refer to:

 William A. Rogers House, Eutaw, Alabama, listed on the National Register of Historic Places (NRHP)
 Will Rogers House (Los Angeles, California), listed in the NRHP in California
 Will Rogers Hotel, Claremore, Oklahoma, listed in the NRHP in Oklahoma
 Will Rogers Birthplace, Oologah, Oklahoma, NRHP-listed
 William Rogers House (Bishopville, South Carolina), NRHP-listed
 William S. Rogers House, Chappell Hill, Texas, listed in the NRHP in Texas

See also
Rogers House (disambiguation)